Richard Anthony DeLucia (born October 7, 1964) is an American former Major League Baseball (MLB) pitcher who played for several teams between  and .

Biography
A native of Reading, Pennsylvania, DeLucia attended Wyomissing High School and the University of Tennessee. In 1984, he played collegiate summer baseball with the Wareham Gatemen of the Cape Cod Baseball League.

DeLucia was selected by the Seattle Mariners in the 6th round of the 1986 MLB Draft and made his major league debut with Seattle in 1990. In a ten-season MLB career, he posted a 4.62 ERA with 502 strikeouts over 624 innings.

DeLucia is currently the owner of 3up 3down Delucia Baseball, offering personal baseball training conducted by former MLB players, consultants, and scouts.

References

External links

1964 births
Living people
American expatriate baseball players in Canada
Anaheim Angels players
Baseball players from Pennsylvania
Bellingham Mariners players
Buffalo Bisons (minor league) players
Calgary Cannons players
Cincinnati Reds players
Cleveland Indians players
Indianapolis Indians players
Los Angeles Dodgers scouts
Major League Baseball pitchers
Sacramento River Cats players
San Bernardino Spirit players
San Francisco Giants players
San Jose Giants players
Seattle Mariners players
St. Louis Cardinals players
Tennessee Volunteers baseball players
Toledo Mud Hens players
Wareham Gatemen players
Williamsport Bills players